St Ives railway station is a railway station which serves the coastal town of St Ives, Cornwall, England. It was opened in 1877 as the terminus of the last new broad gauge passenger railway to be constructed in the country.

History

The platform was on a sharp curve with a goods shed behind it. The town end of the platform was used to load railway trucks with fish that were caught by the many local boats, many of which were drawn up on Porthminster beach, just below the station. A small engine shed was situated on the far side of the viaduct.

The Great Western Railway purchased the Tregenna Castle, on the hill above the station, and opened it as a hotel to coincide with the opening of the railway. The railway has played an important part in developing the tourist business in the area.

The line was converted from broad gauge after the last train ran on Friday 20 May 1892; services from the following Monday running as  standard gauge. On 12 November 1894 heavy rain caused flood water to run down Tregenna Hill. It broke through a wall, flooding down onto the station below, from where it cascaded off the other side down on to the beach. The heavy fish traffic of the 19th century largely disappeared during the first half of the 20th century and all goods traffic was withdrawn from the station on 9 September 1963. The signal box was no longer staffed and all the sidings were taken out of use by 1966. A camping coach was positioned here by the Western Region in 1958 and 1959; then there were two coaches from 1960 to 1964.

The line was proposed for closure following the Beeching Report and, because of this, was mentioned in the song "Slow Train" by Flanders and Swann. The line however was reprieved, but the original curved station was closed on 23 May 1971 and a new, straight, platform opened on the site of the goods shed to replace it. The site of the original station is now a car park, but the railway also brings people from the Park and Ride car park at St Erth.

Stationmaters

Charles L. Williams 1877 – 1912
Frank Hobley 1912 – 1918 (formerly station master at Banbury)
C.E. Welch c. 1920 – 1926
N.W. Bickford 1926 – 1931
F.J. Morrish 1931 – 1940
R.P. Grenfell 1940 – 1951 (formerly station master at St Erth)
A. Webb c. 1960

Description

The station is situated on the hill above Porthminster beach on the south side of the town. There is a large car park adjacent to the platform, and the town centre is a short walk down the hill from the car park entrance. The town's small bus station is situated at the car park entrance. A travel agency immediately adjacent to the station platform contains a rail ticket booking office. Tickets issued to/from the station describe it as "St Ives Cornwall". A path leads from the car park down to Porthminster beach, from where the South West Coast Path can be followed back to Carbis Bay or through the town towards Lands End.

Services

All trains are operated by Great Western Railway. During the daytime there are two services each hour. Only one of these typically calls at Lelant, with some gaps.

References

External links

Video footage and history of St Ives railway station

Railway stations in Cornwall
Former Great Western Railway stations
Railway stations in Great Britain opened in 1877
Railway stations served by Great Western Railway
Buildings and structures in St Ives, Cornwall
DfT Category F1 stations